Utricularia prehensilis is a small to medium-sized, probably perennial carnivorous plant that belongs to the genus Utricularia. It is native to tropical and southern Africa, where it can be found in Angola, the Central African Republic, the Democratic Republic of the Congo, Ethiopia, Kenya, Madagascar, South Africa, Eswatini, Tanzania, Zambia, and Zimbabwe. It was originally described by Ernst Heinrich Friedrich Meyer in 1837.

See also 
 List of Utricularia species

References 

Carnivorous plants of Africa
Flora of Angola
Flora of Ethiopia
Flora of Kenya
Flora of Madagascar
Flora of South Africa
Flora of Swaziland
Flora of Tanzania
Flora of the Central African Republic
Flora of the Democratic Republic of the Congo
Flora of Zambia
Flora of Zimbabwe
prehensilis